The 1978–79 Norwegian 1. Divisjon season was the 40th season of ice hockey in Norway. Ten teams participated in the league, and Frisk Asker won the championship.

First round

Second round

Final round

Relegation round

8th place tiebreaker 
 Forward Flyers - Sparta Sarpsborg 5:3

External links 
 Norwegian Ice Hockey Federation

Nor
GET-ligaen seasons
1978 in Norwegian sport
1979 in Norwegian sport